Inverkeithing High School is a secondary school located in Inverkeithing, a historic former port town on the Fife coast.

The existing building dates from the early 1970s and is to be replaced by a secondary school in nearby Rosyth. It was designed by architect Gavin Haveron McConnell who was influenced by Le Corbusier and introduced some elements into the structure such as the pilotis which give open circulation under part of the building, and the accessible roof space. In 2004, the building received Listed status (Category B) from Historic Environment Scotland for its inventive Late Modern design. The building is due to be replaced by 2026. In November 2020, the education and children's services committee voted 14-4 in favour of building it at the Fleet Grounds, Rosyth.

The school teaches pupils from Inverkeithing, Hillend, Dalgety Bay, Rosyth, North Queensferry, Aberdour and High Valleyfield, but also from Dunfermline under exceptional circumstances. The school employs approximately 100 staff.  The school also has many sports teams in sports such as football, rugby and basketball.  In the 2012-2013 season, the school managed fourth place in the Fife school basketball league, and reached the third round with every year group in the Scottish cup.  The PE department play an active role in participating in teacher vs pupils matches across all sports, with the help of other teachers if needed.

In 2007 it became the first Secondary School in Fife to be awarded an Eco-Schools Green Flag – this reflects the staff and students commitment to the environment.  In November 2011 the school successfully passed the assessment for a  third Green Flag. The school also achieved the Radio Forth Teacher of the Year 2011, Mrs Gordon, as a staff member.

The school has a strong academic tradition, with over 59% of its intake proceeding to higher and further education. IHS has also formed a unique link with Carnegie College (now Fife College) in Dunfermline, developing vocational courses and group awards for a range of students. The work in the area has gained national recognition.  The school celebrated its 40th birthday in 2013, after pupils first went to Inverkeithing High School in 1972.

The school population exceeds 1500 (students ranging in age from 11 to 18), with 6% of students coming from outwith the catchment area.

Notable former pupils 

Stephen Hendry – World Snooker champion
Michael Scott – Professional footballer
Gordon Durie - Professional footballer

Notable former staff 
Lindsay Roy – Glenrothes Labour MP (2008–2015)

References

External links 
 

Secondary schools in Fife
Inverkeithing
1972 establishments in Scotland
Educational institutions established in 1972
Dalgety Bay
Rosyth